Life After Sex is a 1992 film directed by Serge Rodnunsky by Rojak Films. It stars Rodnunsky, Lane Lenhart, Maggie Mabie, Kathleen Beller, and Tommy Chong.

References

External links

1992 films
Canadian independent films
Canadian romantic comedy films
English-language Canadian films
American romantic comedy films
American independent films
1990s English-language films
1990s American films
1990s Canadian films